Diplopseustis metallias is a moth in the family Crambidae. It was described by Edward Meyrick in 1897. It is found in Indonesia, where it has been recorded from the Sangihe Islands.

References

Spilomelinae
Endemic fauna of Indonesia
Moths described in 1897
Moths of Indonesia
Taxa named by Edward Meyrick